Seeing Voices: A Journey Into the World of the Deaf is a 1989 book by neurologist Oliver Sacks. The book covers a variety of topics in Deaf studies, including sign language, the neurology of deafness, the history of the treatment of Deaf Americans, and linguistic and social challenges facing the Deaf community. It also contains an eyewitness account of the March 1988 Deaf President Now student protest at Gallaudet University, the only liberal arts college for deaf and hard of hearing in the world. Seeing Voices was Sacks' fifth book.

Reception
Critics of Seeing Voices agreed that the book is highly informative. Publishers Weekly described it as "extraordinarily moving and thought-provoking". While Debra Berlanstein of Library Journal characterized the book as insightful, she wrote that it seems more suited to a scholarly audience than some of Sacks' more popular books.

Editions
This list only provides details for the most significant editions
First U.S. Edition: University of California Press, 1989, hardcover, 180 pages, .
First Canadian Edition: Stoddart Publishing, 1989, hardcover, 180 pages, .
1990-91: Six more editions.
U.S. Reprint: Vintage Books (Knopf Publishing), 2000, paperback, 240 pages, .
 U.S. updated paperback edition (HarperPerennial), 1990, 186pp,

References

External links
Seeing Voices (Oliver Sacks' official website)
Oliver Sacks discusses Seeing Voices with John Forrester - a British Library sound recording

Books by Oliver Sacks
1989 non-fiction books
Deaf culture in the United States
Picador (imprint) books
University of California Press books
Literature about deaf people